= Academic ranks in Colombia =

Academic ranks in Colombia are the titles, relative importance and power of professors, researchers, and administrative personnel held in academia.

== Overview ==
Academic ranks:

- Profesor Emérito (Emeritus Professor)
- Profesor Titular (Full Professor)
- Profesor Asociado (Associate Professor)
- Profesor Asistente or Principal (Assistant Professor)
- Profesor Auxiliar (Lecturer)
- Instructor (non-doctoral teacher, mostly holding a bachelor's or master's degree)

Types of employment:

- Profesor de planta (Full- or part-time faculty, may hold any of the above ranks)
- Profesor ocasional o de cátedra (Adjunct faculty)

== Professorship ==
In Colombia the words in Spanish "Profesor/Profesora" are used indistinctly for teachers at primary or secondary schools (synonym of "maestra/maestro, docente) or university professors. However there is the more specific designation as university professor "professor universitario" or "docente universitario". The current government regulation for university professor is by a national law, decree 1279 of 2002. In that law, the complete conditions, scales and degrees, as well as salary calculations for university professors are regulated. To be selected as university professor requires to apply to a public open call, containing requirements inside the institution and the experience profile of the candidate must be the one matching best. The process to evaluate, review and select from the total applicants from a competitive basis is performed by a commissioned university council consisting of university professors, and includes several tests in research project formulation, teaching tests and CV and interview evaluation. Briefly, there are four main scales for such permanent positions, as direct tenure employees, and public servants of a particular legal status inside the State contracting rules: lecturer (Profesor Auxiliar), assistant professor (Profesor Asistente), associate professor (Profesor Asociado) and full professor (Profesor Titular), the highest professorship position considered in the Colombian public system, usually conferred to an individual with a long verifiable experience as a researcher or as a university professor, usually an academic with the highest postgraduate education title available in the university system (Doctor), equivalent to a doctoral degree such Ph.D. (USA) or Doktor (Germany); more than 10 years of certified teaching at university level, or equivalent time of recognized scientific work and production. Given the large amount of private universities in the country, those institutions hire new professors following many of the rules set in this public law for scale and salary calculations. There are university professors contracted per hours "docente cátedra, docente occasional, supernumerario, o visitante" to teach specific courses, similarly to lecturers, and while they may have the high qualifications and perform eventually research activities, they are not official employees of the institution and they do not have proper welfare working conditions, pension costs covered or hours for class preparation financed.
